Solo Music: Ahkreanvention is a studio album by jazz trumpeter Wadada Leo Smith released in 1979 by Kabell Records label.
 The compositions were later included in his album Kabell Years: 1971–1979, with the exception of two tracks performed on Ghanaian flute ("Sarhanna" and "Kashala") that were omitted at Smith's request.

Background
Smith said that he wanted "to create and invent musical ideas simultaneously, utilizing the fundamental laws of improvisation and composition. Within this system, all of the elements of the scored music are controlled through symbols designating duration, improvisation, and moving sounds of different velocities".

Track listing

References

Wadada Leo Smith albums
1979 albums